John Abraham is an Indian actor, film producer and former model who has been featured in over 50 films predominantly in Hindi language. After a successful career as a model, Abraham began his acting career with an erotic thriller film Jism in 2003, which was a box office hit. In the same year, he appeared in Anurag Basu's horror paranormal romance film Saaya and Pooja Bhatt's directorial debut film Paap. Abraham starred as Kabir in the multi-starrer Dhoom, an action film directed by Sanjay Gadhvi, and produced by Yash Raj Films, The film was the third highest-grossing film of the year, which gained him a Filmfare Award for Best Performance in a Negative Role nomination. 
 
In 2008, Abraham starred alongside Abhishek Bachchan and Priyanka Chopra in Dostana, his only release that year. His first release of 2009 was a production by Yash Raj Films, New York. Dostana was a commercial success and grossed over 871 million, becoming one of the highest grossing Hindi films of 2008. This was a turning point in his career.

Filmography

Music videos

References

External links 
John Abraham filmography at IMDb

Indian filmographies
Male actor filmographies